The 3rd Arab Swimming Championships were held from 4 to 7 April 2016 in Dubai, United Arab Emirates at the Hamdan Sports Complex.

Participating countries

Medal standings

Results

Men

Women

Mixed

External links 
Results book

Arab Swimming Championships
Arab Swimming Championships
Arab Swimming Championships
Swimming competitions in the United Arab Emirates